Peak gold is the date at which the maximum rate of global gold extraction is reached. According to Hubbert peak theory, after the peak, the rate of production declines until it approaches zero. Unlike petroleum, which is destroyed in use, gold can be reused and recycled.

Supply and demand
World gold demand (defined in terms of total consumption excluding central banks) in 2007 was 3,519 tonnes. Gold demand is subdivided into central bank reserve increases, jewellery production, industrial consumption (including dental), and investment (bars, coins, exchange-traded funds, etc.)

The supply of gold is provided by mining, official sales (typically gold by central banks), de-hedging (physical delivery of metal sold months before by mining companies on terminal markets) and old gold scraps. The total world supply of gold in 2007 was 3,497 tonnes. Gold production (mining) does not need to make up for gold demand because gold is a reusable resource. Currently, yearly gold mining produces 2% of the existing above-ground gold which is 158,000 tonnes (as of 2006). In 2008, gold mining produced 2,400 tonnes of gold, official gold sales close to 300 tonnes, and dehedging (physical delivery of metal sold months before by mining companies on terminal markets)  close to 500 tonnes.

Timing of peak production
World mined gold production has peaked four times since 1900: in 1912, 1940, 1971, and 2001, each peak being higher than previous peaks. The latest peak was in 2001, when production reached 2,600 metric tons, then declined for several years. Production started to increase again in 2009, spurred by high gold prices, and achieved record new highs each year from 2011 through 2015, when production reached 3,100 tonnes. Early estimates of 2016 gold production indicate that it was flat to 2015 production, at 3,100 tonnes.

In 2009, Barrick CEO Aaron Regent claimed that global production had peaked in 2000. Barrick's production costs have been "trending down" despite this peak, reaching . He predicted that higher prices and new technologies would boost gold production to higher levels in the future.

In July 2012, Natural Resource Holdings CEO Roy Sebag wrote a report entitled "2012 World Gold Deposit Ranking" claiming that gold production would peak between 2022 and 2025 due to the markedly lower grades and remote locations of the remaining known undeveloped deposits. "Consequently, the guaranteed depletion in the existing production mix coupled with a more realistic introduction of new mines into the mix (as opposed to our theoretical 
tomorrow scenario) makes it clear that barring multiple high-grade, multi-million ounce 
discoveries each year, a significant increase in gold production is unlikely. Moreover our 
calculations point towards gold production peaking at some point 

Charles Jeannes, the CEO of Goldcorp, the world's largest gold miner by market capitalization, stated in September 2014 that Peak Gold would be reached in either 2014 or 2015. "Whether it is this year or next year, I don't think we will ever see the gold production reach these levels again," he claimed. "There are just not that many new mines being found and developed."

References

Gold
Gold